Sport Clube Praiense commonly known as simply as Praiense is a Portuguese sports club from the region of Praia da Vitória, Azores. Founded in 1947, the club currently plays at the Estádio Municipal da Praia da Vitória which holds a seating capacity of 1500. In its entire history, Praiense has only ever won one major trophy which was in the 2007–08 season where they won the Terceira Divisão.

Current squad

References

External links
 
 Club profile at ForaDeJogo
 Club profile at ZeroZero

 
Football clubs in Portugal
Football clubs in the Azores
Association football clubs established in 1947
1947 establishments in Portugal
Football clubs in Terceira Island